Bethanien Airport  is an airport serving the town of Bethanien, Namibia.

See also
List of airports in Namibia
Transport in Namibia

References

 Google Earth

External links
OurAirports - Namibia
OpenStreetMap - Bethanien

Airports in Namibia